Francis William 'Frank' Vincent (born 23 April 1999) is an English footballer who  played as a midfielder for Aldershot Town on loan from Notts County before returning when his loan expired in Jan 2023.

Career
Vincent joined AFC Bournemouth from Barnet at the end of the 2016–17 season. On 31 January 2019, he joined National League South side Torquay United on loan until the end of the season. In July 2019, he rejoined Torquay United on another loan, this time agreeing a season-long deal. This loan spell was cut short after an ankle injury saw him return to Bournemouth in November. In August 2020, Vincent joined League Two side Scunthorpe United on a season-long loan deal. However, on 5 January 2021, he was recalled by Bournemouth. Two weeks later, he headed out on loan to League Two again, this time joining Walsall until the end of the season.

Notts County
On 2 July 2021, Vincent joined National League club Notts County on a permanent transfer.

On 20 August 2022, Vincent signed for fellow National League club Aldershot Town on a one-month loan deal. Having missed only one match against his parent club, Vincent's loan spell was extended for a further three months on 26 September.

Career statistics

References

1999 births
Living people
English footballers
Association football midfielders
Queens Park Rangers F.C. players
Barnet F.C. players
AFC Bournemouth players
Torquay United F.C. players
Scunthorpe United F.C. players
Walsall F.C. players
Notts County F.C. players
Aldershot Town F.C. players
National League (English football) players
English Football League players